SN 2011by was a supernova in NGC 3972.  It was a type Ia supernova, discovered by Zhangwei Jin and Xing Gao (China). SN 2011by is about 5.3" east and 19.1" north of the center of NGC 3972.

References

External links
 Light curves and spectra  on the Open Supernova Catalog

2011 in science
Supernovae
20110426
Ursa Major (constellation)